The Women's solo event at the 2015 European Games in Baku took place between 13 and 16 June at the Baku Aquatics Centre.

Schedule
All times are local (UTC+5).

Results

Preliminary

Final

References

External links

Solo